Žan Mark Šiško (born June 29, 1997) is a Slovenian professional basketball player for Bayern Munich of the Basketball Bundesliga and the EuroLeague.

Club career
Šiško began his professional career with Slovenian powerhouse Union Olimpija, making his official debut in March 2014 at the age of 16.

During the 2015–16 season, he was part of Croatian team Cibona. On November 1, 2015, Šiško made his ABA League debut in a game against Igokea, finishing the game with 11 points and 3 assists. He saw court during 12 games and averaged 2.9 points and 2 assists.

On December 28, 2019, Šiško signed a contract with German team Bayern Munich. In July 2022, he extended his contract with Bayern for another two years.

International career
On November 24, 2017, Šiško made his debut for the Slovenian national team in the 2019 FIBA Basketball World Cup qualification game against Belarus.

References

External links
 Žan Mark Šiško at euroleaguebasketball.net
 Žan Mark Šiško at aba-liga.com
 Žan Mark Šiško at fiba.com

1997 births
Living people
ABA League players
FC Bayern Munich basketball players
KD Ilirija players
KK Cibona players
KK Olimpija players
Point guards
Slovenian expatriate basketball people in Croatia
Slovenian expatriate basketball people in Germany
Slovenian men's basketball players
Basketball players from Ljubljana